Danie Burger Schoeman (born 26 September 1988) is a South African rugby union footballer. His regular playing position is either flanker or eighthman. He represents the Griquas in the Currie Cup and Vodacom Cup. Schoeman previously played age-level rugby for Western Province and played in the Varsity Cup for Maties.

External links

itsrugby.co.uk profile

Living people
1988 births
South African rugby union players
Rugby union flankers
Rugby union number eights
White South African people
Griquas (rugby union) players
Griffons (rugby union) players
Sportspeople from Paarl
Stellenbosch University alumni
Rugby union players from the Western Cape